Anastasios "Tasos" Gavrilis (born December 21, 1952) is a Greek Olympic medalist and competitor. He won a Bronze medal in the Soling final at the 1980 Summer Olympics in Moscow, USSR.

References 

1952 births
Living people
Greek male sailors (sport)
Olympic bronze medalists for Greece
Olympic sailors of Greece
Olympic medalists in sailing
Sailors at the 1980 Summer Olympics – Soling
Star class sailors
Medalists at the 1980 Summer Olympics